Daniel Zingaro is an associate professor at the University of Toronto Mississauga. His main areas of research are in evaluating Computer science education and online learning. He has co-authored over 80 articles in peer-reviewed journals and conferences; and also authored a textbook, "Invariants: a Generative Approach to Programming.

Born visually impaired, Zingaro completed B.Sc. and M.Sc. in computer science from McMaster University. He then received a Ph.D. from Ontario Institute for Studies in Education (OISE) at the University of Toronto in Computer Science Education. His master's thesis was about formalizing and proving properties of parsers. His doctoral thesis was titled " Evaluating Peer Instruction in First-year University Computer Science Courses". Daniel Zingaro designed accessible computer games and published work in Computers & Education, International Computing Education Research (ICER) conference, Computer Science Education, British Journal of Educational Technology, and Transactions on Computing Education.

Selected publications

Awards
 ICER Best Paper Award, 2014
 SIGCSE 2016 best paper award
 JOLT 2012 best paper award

References

Year of birth missing (living people)
Living people
University of Toronto alumni
Canadian computer scientists